Mark Lui (born 9 July 1969) is from Hong Kong. He is a composer and producer of Cantopop music with the "On Your Mark" creative team, and part of the Artists and Repertoire team at East Asia Record Production Co., Ltd.

Notable works include singers Hacken Lee and Alan Tam's "Neighbours", Leon Lai's "Words of Love Not Yet Spoken", Kelly Chen's "Everything is Beautiful Because of You", "Paisley Galaxy ", etc.

He is also a Fashion Designer with COOLDAY, SIR – A Today Is Cool Fashion Brand Solo Shop.

External links
Amusic Official Website
 CoolDay, Sir Brand official website
 Today is Cool Brand official website
 Today is Cool Facebook Page
 Tencent Weibo Official Website
 Sina Weibo Official Website
Hong Kong Cinemagic entry

1969 births
Living people
Cantopop singer-songwriters
Dry (group) members
Hong Kong male singers
Hong Kong male composers
Hong Kong male actors
Music directors
Hong Kong record producers
Music arrangers
Hong Kong lyricists
Hong Kong songwriters
Hong Kong fashion designers
Alumni of St. Paul's Co-educational College
Hong Kong composers